The following lists events that happened during 1977 in Botswana.

Incumbents
 President: Seretse Khama 
 Vice President: Quett Masire (1966-1980)

Events
 4 October - A referendum on electoral reform was held.

Births
 July 28 - Anthony Matengu, Botswana footballer

See also
 History of Botswana
 List of Botswana-related topics
 Outline of Botswana

References

 
Years of the 20th century in Botswana
1970s in Botswana
Botswana
Botswana